Matija Kranjc (born 12 June 1984) is a Slovenian track and field athlete who competes in the javelin throw. His personal best of 81.13 metres, achieved in June 2016, is the Slovenian record.

Achievements

Seasonal bests by year
2003 - 68.50 
2005 - 76.04
2006 - 72.45
2007 - 78.08
2008 - 76.15
2009 - 77.82
2010 - 74.65
2011 - 79.72
2012 - 77.59
2013 - 79.15
2014 - 80.46
2015 - 78.35
2016 - 81.13 NR
2017 - 76.88

References
sports-reference

1984 births
Living people
Slovenian male javelin throwers
Athletes (track and field) at the 2008 Summer Olympics
Athletes (track and field) at the 2012 Summer Olympics
Olympic athletes of Slovenia
Sportspeople from Ljubljana
Mediterranean Games bronze medalists for Slovenia
Mediterranean Games medalists in athletics
Athletes (track and field) at the 2009 Mediterranean Games
Athletes (track and field) at the 2013 Mediterranean Games
21st-century Slovenian people